Joseph Eugene Pazandak (October 23, 1914 – December 2, 1982) was an American  amateur wrestler and a professional wrestler, best known for his ring name Joe Pazandak. Pazandak received the nickname "The Champ" as he ruled the “Beat the Champ” segment on televised wrestling from Los Angeles.

Professional wrestling career 
Pazandak made his professional wrestling debut in his hometown in Minneapolis at the age of 22, where he faced Al Loset which ended in a 20-minute time limit draw. As an amateur heavyweight, he won two AAU championships in the Northwest and went on to wrestle at the University of Minnesota before turning professional. Within a year, Pazandak was traveling around the country from Massachusetts to North Carolina to Maryland, mostly as a semi-main event performer.  Pazandak served in the United States Army as a sergeant in Africa and Italy during World War II. Pazandak returned to the United States in 1944, after seeing 624 days of active combat. His first match since returning from the war took place in October 1945, where he defeated the highly skilled Ray Steele.

Pazandak's popularity rose in the beginning of June 1951 in Los Angeles. As the inaugural NWA "Beat the Champ" Television Championship, Pazandak defended the title for nine months against top challengers. Press-Telegram once named Pazandak "the most feared man in the wrestling ranks", in reference to his undefeated record on the West Coast.

With Pazandak's amateur wrestling background, in 1948, he was hired to coach amateur wrestlers in New Zealand, which saw him working alongside Karl Pojello. Pazandak also trained Verne Gagne.

Death 
Pazandak died on December 2, 1983. He was 68 years old.

Championships and accomplishments

Amateur wrestling 
 Amateur Athletic Union
 Northwest AAU Championship (1935–1936)

Professional wrestling 
 NWA Los Angeles
 NWA "Beat the Champ" Television Championship (1 time)
 NWA International Television Tag Team Championship (1 time) – with Lord James Blears
 Professional Wrestling Hall of Fame'''
 Class of 2016

References 

1914 births
1982 deaths
American male professional wrestlers
Professional wrestlers from Minneapolis
Professional Wrestling Hall of Fame and Museum
United States Army personnel of World War II
United States Army non-commissioned officers
NWA "Beat the Champ" Television Champions